Phillip Byrne (10 April 1874 – 12 January 1946) was an Irish hurler who played for the Tipperary senior team.

Byrne made his first appearance for the team during the 1895 championship and was a regular member of the starting fifteen at various times until his retirement after the 1904 championship. During that time he won four All-Ireland medals and four Munster medals.

At club level Byrne played with both Clonoulty–Rossmore and Boherlahan–Dualla.

References

1874 births
1946 deaths
Clonoulty-Rossmore hurlers
Boherlahan-Dualla hurlers
Tipperary inter-county hurlers
All-Ireland Senior Hurling Championship winners